"Hayfever" is a song by Scottish band The Trash Can Sinatras, which was released in 1993 as the lead single from their second studio album I've Seen Everything. The song was written by all five band members and produced by Ray Shulman. "Hayfever" reached No. 61 in the UK Singles Chart and No. 11 in the Billboard Modern Rock Tracks chart.

Background
"Hayfever" was recorded at Shabby Road Studios in Kilmarnock, Scotland, and mixed at Orinoco Studios in London.

Critical reception
In a review of I've Seen Everything, Scott Bacon of The Indianapolis Star described "Hayfever" as "bouncy" and considered the song to have "hit written all over it". He also praised Nick Ingham's string arrangement which he felt "enhance[d]" the song. Brad Webber of the Chicago Tribune commented, "On 'Hayfever', Reader wistfully sings about solving life's problems 'with a couple of tablets'."

Track listing
7-inch and cassette single
 "Hayfever" – 3:15
 "Say" – 2:51

12-inch and CD single
 "Hayfever" – 3:15
 "Say" – 2:51
 "Kangaroo Court" – 3:02
 "Skin Diving" – 3:47

Personnel
Credits are adapted from the UK CD single liner notes and the I've Seen Everything booklet.

The Trash Can Sinatras
 Frank Reader – vocals, guitar
 Paul Livingston – guitar
 John Douglas – guitar
 David Hughes – bass
 Stephen Douglas – drums

Additional personnel
 Larry Primrose – piano on "Hayfever"
 Nick Ingham – string arrangement on "Hayfever"

Production
 Ray Shulman – producer, engineer, mixing
 Larry Primrose – engineer, mixing

Other
 John Douglas – sleeve painting

Charts

References

1993 songs
1993 singles
Go! Discs singles